George William Holmes (1892 – after 1922) was an English footballer who played as a defender for Burslem Port Vale, Merthyr Tydfil, The Wednesday and Wrexham.

Career
Holmes joined Burslem Port Vale from Leek Alexandra in August 1916. He made his first team debut at left-back in a 5–1 defeat to Liverpool at Anfield in a World War I war league game on 23 December 1916. He became a regular in the first team from December 1917, before he was released in the summer of 1919. He joined The Wednesday via Merthyr Tydfil and made 21 appearances for the "Owls" between 17 September 1921 and 13 March 1922. He later played for Wrexham.

Career statistics
Source:

References

1892 births
Footballers from Staffordshire
English footballers
Association football defenders
Port Vale F.C. players
Merthyr Tydfil F.C. players
Sheffield Wednesday F.C. players
Wrexham A.F.C. players
English Football League players
Year of death missing